Walter Grieb (born 3 February 1911, date of death unknown) is a Swiss boxer who competed in the 1936 Summer Olympics. In 1936 he was eliminated in the second round of the welterweight class after losing his fight to Roger Tritz of France.

External links
Walter Grieb's profile at Sports Reference.com

1911 births
Year of death missing
Welterweight boxers
Olympic boxers of Switzerland
Boxers at the 1936 Summer Olympics
Swiss male boxers